BJPS may refer to:

Brebeuf Jesuit Preparatory School
British Journal for the Philosophy of Science
British Journal of Political Science
Brazilian Journal of Probability and Statistics